Zonguldak is a city and the capital of Zonguldak Province in the Black Sea region of Turkey. It was established in 1849 as a port town for the nearby coal mines in Ereğli and the coal trade remains its main economic activity. According to the 2009 census, Zonguldak has a population of 108,792. The current mayor is Ömer Selim Alan, representing the AKP.

Etymology
There are several different theories concerning the origin of the city's name:
 That it comes from Zone Geul-Dagh, the name given to the area by French and Belgian mining companies from French "zone" and a French spelling of Turkish Göldağı ('Lake Mountain'), the highest mountain in the vicinity of the Devrek district.
 That the name may derive from the name of the nearby ancient settlement of Sandaraca or Sandarake (in Ancient Greek Σανδαράκη).
 That the name may have come from "jungle" (which the French entrepreneurs called the area due to its uneven wooded geography) plus Turkish  'mountain'.

In a 1920 report, the British Foreign Office spelled Zonguldak Zunguldak.

History

The port city of Zonguldak suffered a heavy bombardment by the Russians during World War I, according to the caption of a Lubok popular print.

As of 1920, the port was under the control of the Heraclea Coal Company. The northern part of the bay featured a man-made harbor, for steamship use. At that time, they had two cranes which distributed coal to exporting vessels.

Climate
According to the Köppen climate classification, for a long time Zonguldak was considered to have an oceanic climate (Cfb), with its warmest month being well below the 22 °C threshold, yet in recent decades climate change and global warming has been contributing to its classification in slowly turning humid subtropical (Cfa) and therefore the city center on the immediate coastline is currently classified as borderline oceanic-humid subtropical. If this trend continues, coastal Zonguldak will soon be classified as purely humid subtropical. Summers are warm, the average temperature is around 22.5 °C in July and August. Winters are cool, the average temperature is around 6 °C in January and February. Precipitation is frequent, while it is generally heaviest in autumn and early winter, lightest (although still frequent) in spring.

The water temperature is cool to mild and fluctuates between 8° C and 20 °C throughout the year.

Health
Because of coal there is a lot of lung disease.

Economy
Jobs in coal in Turkey are being lost and in 2020 the EBRD proposed a just transition.

Transportation

The city is the terminus of a railway line to Irmak, with the terminating station Zonguldak Railway Station built in 1937.

International relations

Twin towns — sister cities
Zonguldak is twinned with:
 Brindisi, Apulia,  Italy
 Castrop-Rauxel, North Rhine-Westphalia, Germany
 Kherson, Kherson Oblast, Ukraine
 Monfalcone, Friuli Venezia Giulia, Italy

Notable people 

Ergün Penbe - Turkish former footballer

Murat Boz - Turkish singer-songwriter and actor

Nilgün Efes - Turkish entrepreneur and journalist

See also
Zonguldak basin

References

External links

 Zonguldak Municipality official website 
 Provincial governor's official website 
 History of Zonguldak
 History of Mind
 Zonguldak Documentary

Videos
 Video 1 Zonguldak Akşamları
 Video 2 Resimlerle Zonguldak

 
Populated places in Zonguldak Province
Black Sea port cities and towns in Turkey
Populated places established in 1849
Mining in Turkey
Zonguldak Central District
Populated coastal places in Turkey
Districts of Zonguldak Province
1849 establishments in the Ottoman Empire
Greek colonies in Bithynia